Nuno Miguel Santos Rodrigues (born 30 November 1994) is a Portuguese professional footballer who plays for Sporting da Covilhã as a midfielder.

Football career
He made his Taça da Liga debut for Mafra on 28 July 2019 in a game against Oliveirense.

References

External links

1994 births
People from Tábua
Sportspeople from Coimbra District
Living people
Portuguese footballers
Association football midfielders
F.C. Oliveira do Hospital players
Juventude de Pedras Salgadas players
G.D. Gafanha players
Lusitano FCV players
C.D. Mafra players
F.C. Arouca players
U.D. Vilafranquense players
S.C. Covilhã players
Liga Portugal 2 players
Campeonato de Portugal (league) players